is a town located in Niigata Prefecture, Japan. , the town had an estimated population of 11,481 in 4203 households, and a population density of 362 persons per km².

Geography
Tagami is located in central Niigata Prefecture, bordered by the city of Niigata to the north. The Shinano River flows through the town.

Surrounding municipalities
Niigata Prefecture
Minami-ku, Niigata
Akiha-ku, Niigata
Kamo
Gosen

Climate
Tagami has a Humid climate (Köppen Cfa) characterized by warm, wet summers and cold winters with heavy snowfall.  The average annual temperature in Tagami is 13.0 °C. The average annual rainfall is 1958 mm with September as the wettest month. The temperatures are highest on average in August, at around 26.3 °C, and lowest in January, at around 1.2 °C.

Demographics
Per Japanese census data, the population of Tagami peaked at around the year 2000 and has declined steadily since.

History
The area of present-day Tagami was part of ancient Echigo Province and was part of the tenryō territories administered directly by the Tokugawa shogunate during the Edo period.. The village of Tagami was established within Minamikanbara District, Niigata on April 1, 1889 with the creation of the modern municipalities system. Its as raised to town status on August 1, 1973.

Economy
The local economy is dominated by agriculture, notably rice production. However, the town is increasingly becoming a bedroom community for neighbouring Niigata city, Sanjo and Kamo.

Education
Tagami has two public elementary schools and one public middle school operated by the town government. There is no high school within town limits; however, the Niigata Chuoh Junior College is located in Tagami.

Transportation

Railway
 JR East - Shin'etsu Main Line

Highway

References

External links

Official Website 

 
Towns in Niigata Prefecture